William Lee Woollett (1873-1955) was an American architect practicing mainly in California. He designed theaters in Los Angeles in the 1920s including the largest movie theater ever built in Los Angeles, Grauman's Metropolitan Theatre which opened in 1923.

Life and career

Early life 
William Lee Woollett was born in Albany, New York on November 13, 1873 to William M. and Sarah Louise Woollett (née Knappen).  His father died when he was seven years old.

Education 
Around 1892, Woollett studied architecture at the Massachusetts Institute of Technology. He apprenticed as a draftsman for Fehmer & Page, Architects, Boston, MA (1892-1896).

Early career 
Woollett returned to Albany in 1896 to open his office. He was joined a few years later by his younger brother, John Woodward Woollett, also an architect.  Together, they founded the firm, Woollett and Woollett Architects becoming the 3rd consecutive generation of Woolletts to practice architecture in Albany. After the San Francisco earthquake of 1906, Woollett and Woollett opened a branch office in San Francisco. William Woollett moved his family to Berkeley in 1908 and closed the Albany office. Woollett and Woollett was located in San Francisco until 1917 when William Lee Woollett relocated to Los Angeles. In 1921, the firm relocated permanently to Los Angeles.

Later life and death
Woollett died on February 11, 1955. He is buried at Grand View Memorial Park Cemetery in Glendale, California.

Significant Buildings 
Woollett & Woollett are responsible for a number of significant structures in California including:

 Tajo Building, Downtown Los Angeles, CA 1896-97
 Municipal Rose Garden, Oakland, CA
 Syndicate Building, Downtown Oakland, CA 1910-11
 The Berkeley Piano Club, Berkeley, CA 1912
 Hotel Royal, Oakland, CA 1912/13
 Quinn’s Rialto Theater, Los Angeles, CA 1916-17
 Million Dollar Theater, Downtown Los Angeles, 1917-18
 Otis Hoyt House, Long Beach, CA 1920
 McClain House, Beverly Hills, CA 1920
Lee B. Memefee House, Hollywood, CA 1920
Grauman’s Metropolitan Theater & Office Building, Downtown Los Angeles, 1921-23
Lakeside Country Club, Toluca Lake, CA 1924-25
 George Lockwood Eastman House, West Hollywood, CA 1926
 City of Los Angeles Public Library Malabar Branch #2, Boyle Heights, CA 1926/7
 E.J. Longyear House, Alta Dena, CA 1927
 John J. Iten House, Lake Arrowhead, CA 1930
 City of Oakland, Parks Department, Linda Vista Park, Oakland Park, CA 1933-37
 Borrego Valley Defense Program Airfield, Salton Sea, CA 1942
 William Woollett House, Glendale, CA
Paramount Theater (Destroyed), Los Angeles, CA

Publications 

 Naylor, David, American Picture Palaces The Architecture of Fantasy, 83, 85, 217, 1981.
 "Grauman's Metropolitan Theater", Architect and Engineer, 73: 2, 51-85, 1923-05.
 "West Hollywood residence", Architect & Engineer, 75, 5/1927.
 "Metropolitan Theatre", Concrete in Architecture, 28-39, 1927.
 "Boyle Heights libraries renovations underway", Eastside Sun, 02/21/1991.
 Gebhard, David, Winter, Robert, Los Angeles An Architectural Guide, 234, 1994.
 "Eastman most valuable Los Angeles citizen in'28", Los Angeles Examiner, 1/13/1929.
 "Interior Design for New Hill Street Motion Picture Playhouse", Los Angeles Times, 1, 1921-05-22.
 Jones, Roger E., "Decoratively, artistically, architecturally - it presents something unique and beautiful: the Million Dollar Theatre, Los Angeles, California", Marquee, 34: 2, 6-13, 32, 2002.
 "George Lockwood Eastman article", Southern California Business, 24, 10/1928.
 "Woollett, William Lee Notice", Southwest Builder and Contractor, 11, col. 3, 1920-08-06.
 "McClain House plans, Beverly Hills", Southwest Builder and Contractor, 12, col 3, 08/20/1920.
 "Iten, John J., House plans, Lake Arrowhead", Southwest Builder and Contractor, 58, col 2, 06/20/1930.
 "Eastman House preliminary plans", Southwest Builder & Contractor, 43, col 1, 11/2/1923.
 "Eastman, George L., House plans", Southwest Builder & Contractor, 45, 1/4/1924.
 Ingels, Margaret, Willis Haviland Carrier Father of Air Conditioning, 144-145, 1952.

Legacy 
William Lee Woollett's papers were given to the Architecture and Design Collection of the Art, Design and Architecture Museum, University of California, Santa Barbara (UCSB), in 1981 by his son, William Lee Woollett, FAIA.

References

External links

20th-century American architects
Architects from Albany, New York
Architects from San Francisco
Architects from Los Angeles
1873 births
1955 deaths